Hovsepian is an Armenian family name derived from Hovsep (Armenian for Joseph). Variants of Hovsepian include Hovsepyan, Ovsepyan, Osipian, Housepian, Hosepian, Hovsapian etc. Notable people with the surname include:

Andranik Hovsepyan, former Armenian football player
Albert Ovsepyan, Armenian-Abkhazian politician, a member of the People's Assembly of Abkhazia and a former Vice-Speaker of the Assembly
Cameron Hovsepian, singer who auditioned for season 3 of the American The Voice
Edgar Housepian, neurosurgeon and professor
Haik Hovsepian Mehr, Iranian Christian activist and bishop of Jama'at-e Rabbani, part of the Assemblies of God in Iran until his murder in 1994
Jacob Petros II Hovsepian (Hagop Bedros II Hovsepian), Catholicos-Patriarch of the Armenian Catholic Church from 1749 to 1753. (See List of Armenian Catholic Patriarchs of Cilicia)
Karekin I Hovsepian, Catholicos of the Armenian Apostolic Church's Holy See of Cilicia in Antelias, Lebanon from 1943 to 1952. (See List of Armenian Catholicoi of Cilicia)
Marjorie Housepian Dobkin, Armenian-American author and professor
Moses M. Housepian, Armenian-American physician and medical relief worker, father of Marjorie and Edgar (see above in this list)
Ronald Hovsepian, businessman, President, CEO of IntraLinks Inc.
Ruben Hovsepyan, Armenian writer and politician, a member of the National Assembly from 2000 to 2007
Rumyan Hovsepyan, Armenian football player
Sargis Hovsepyan, Armenian football player
Vanig Rupen Hovsepian, Armenian-American composer and jazz musician better known by his pseudonym, Turk Van Lake
Vatche Hovsepian (sometimes Housepian), Armenian musician and duduk player

Armenian-language surnames
Patronymic surnames
Surnames from given names